The 1990 NCAA Division I-A football season ended with a split national championship and the ensuing controversy helped lead to the creation of the Bowl Coalition, a precursor to the Bowl Championship Series. The national title was split between the Colorado Buffaloes and the Georgia Tech Yellow Jackets. The Buffaloes (11–1–1) took the AP poll while the Yellow Jackets (11–0–1) took the UPI Coaches poll by one vote over Colorado, 847 to 846. During the season Colorado had a particularly controversial victory over Missouri in what would later be known as the "Fifth Down Game".

Rule changes
 Approved reducing the width of the goal posts from 23 feet 9 inches to 18 feet 6 inches starting in 1991.
 Mandated visible 25-second clocks at each end zone.
 Allowed the defense to advance fumbles that occur beyond the line of scrimmage. Previously, fumbles could only be advanced if they were caught in the air.

Conference standings

Bowl games

 Orange Bowl: No. 1 Colorado 10, No. 5 Notre Dame 9
 Cotton Bowl: No. 4 Miami (FL) 46, No. 3 Texas 3
 Rose Bowl: No. 8 Washington 46, No. 17 Iowa 34
 Sugar Bowl: No. 10 Tennessee 23, Virginia 22
 Florida Citrus Bowl: No. 2 Georgia Tech 45, No. 19 Nebraska 21

Other Bowls:
 Fiesta Bowl: No. 18 Louisville 34, No. 25 Alabama 7
 Gator Bowl: No. 12 Michigan 35, No. 15 Mississippi 3
 Hall of Fame Bowl: No. 14 Clemson 30, No. 16 Illinois 0
 John Hancock Bowl: No. 22 Michigan St. 17, No. 21 Southern California 16
 Copper Bowl: California 17, Wyoming 15
 Holiday Bowl: Texas A&M 65, No. 13 Brigham Young 14
 Freedom Bowl: Colorado St. 32, Oregon 31
 Peach Bowl: Auburn 27, Indiana 23
 All-American Bowl: North Carolina St. 31, No. 23 Southern Mississippi 27
 Blockbuster Bowl: No. 6 Florida St. 24, No. 7 Penn St. 17
 Liberty Bowl: Air Force 23, No. 24 Ohio St. 11
 Aloha Bowl: Syracuse 28, Arizona 0
 Independence Bowl: Louisiana Tech 34, Maryland 34
 California Bowl: San Jose St. 48, Central Michigan 24

Final AP Poll

Final UPI/Coaches Poll
 Georgia Tech
 Colorado
 Miami (FL)
 Florida State
 Washington
 Notre Dame
 Tennessee
 Michigan
 Clemson
 Penn State
 Texas
 Louisville
 Texas A&M
 Michigan State
 Virginia
 Iowa
 Brigham Young
 Nebraska
 Auburn
 San Jose State
 Syracuse
 USC
 Mississippi
 Illinois
 Virginia Tech
Florida, Houston and Oklahoma were not eligible to be ranked in the coaches poll due to NCAA probation.

Heisman Trophy voting
The Heisman is given to the Most Outstanding Player of the year
 1. Winner: Ty Detmer, BYU, Jr. QB, 1,482 points
 2. Raghib Ismail, Notre Dame, Jr. WR, 1,177
 3. Eric Bieniemy, Colorado, Sr. RB, 798
 4. Shawn Moore, Virginia, Sr. QB, 465
 5. David Klingler, Houston, Jr. QB, 125
 6. Herman Moore, Virginia, Sr. WR, 68
 7. Greg Lewis, Washington, Sr. RB, 41
 8. Craig Erickson, Miami (FL), Sr. QB, 31
 8. Darren Lewis, Texas A&M, Sr. RB, 31
 10. Mike Mayweather, Army, Sr. RB, 20

Other major awards
 Maxwell Award – Ty Detmer, BYU
 Walter Camp Award – Raghib Ismail, Notre Dame
 O'Brien Award – Ty Detmer, BYU
 Lombardi (Linebacker) – Chris Zorich, Notre Dame
 Outland (Interior) – Russell Maryland, Miami-FL
 AFCA Coach of the Year – Bobby Ross, Georgia Tech

National title
 Colorado Buffaloes – AP Poll
 Georgia Tech Yellow Jackets – UPI Poll

No. 1 and No. 2 progress

Recap of the year
Voters were divided in the first poll of the 1990 college football season. The first rankings reflected the lack of consensus, as No. 1 Miami, No. 2 Notre Dame, No. 3 Auburn, No. 4 Florida State, and No. 5 Colorado each received at least three first-place votes in the preseason poll.

Week One: August 26-September 1, 1990
There was little movement in the polls as most teams either played against non-competitive foes or did not begin the season until September 8. The only significant game was a 31–31 tie between No. 5 Colorado and No. 8 Tennessee in the first-ever Pigskin Classic, played at Anaheim Stadium. The next AP Poll featured Miami and Notre Dame still at Nos. 1 and 2, Auburn and Florida State tied at No. 3, and Michigan at No. 5.

Week Two: September 8, 1990
The most significant game and slight upset of week two came in Provo, Utah, where No. 16 Brigham Young, led by eventual Heisman Trophy winner Ty Detmer, held off the defending champion, No. 1 Miami Hurricanes, 28–21. No. 2 Notre Dame and No. 5 Michigan, who were scheduled to play each other the following week, had not begun their season. No. 3 Auburn defeated Cal State Fullerton 38-17, while fellow No. 3 Florida State beat East Carolina 45-24. A comeback by No. 6 Colorado staved off defeat against unranked Stanford, 17–14. The pollsters remained unimpressed by Colorado, dropping them to No. 9 despite the win. The Gene Stallings era began for No. 13 Alabama with a 27–24 loss to the Southern Mississippi Golden Eagles, quarterbacked by Brett Favre; the Tide opened their season with three straight losses. The Steve Spurrier era also began at Florida, as the unranked Gators beat Oklahoma State 50-7. In Charlottesville, No. 14 Virginia beat No. 9 Clemson 20-7 in what was viewed as an upset. It was Virginia's first win ever over the Tigers, after 29 consecutive losses since their first meeting in 1955. The top five teams in the next poll were No. 1 Notre Dame, No. 2 Auburn, No. 3 Florida State, No. 4 Michigan, and No. 5 Brigham Young.

Week Three: September 15, 1990
The most important game of week three was a top five match-up of No. 1 Notre Dame against No. 4 Michigan. In an exciting game, the Fighting Irish prevailed 28–24. No. 2 Auburn won 24-10 at Mississippi, No. 3 Florida State defeated Georgia Southern 48-6, No. 5 Brigham Young beat Washington State 50-36, and No. 6 USC got past Penn State 19-14. The other game that would have season-long significance was No. 21 Illinois' upset of No. 9 Colorado, 23–22. The game would figure prominently in the national championship argument in January. Spurrier also won his SEC debut, with No. 24 Florida besting Alabama 17–13. The next poll featured No. 1 Notre Dame, No. 2 Florida State, No. 3 Auburn, No. 4 Brigham Young, and No. 5 USC.

Week Four: September 22, 1990
No. 1 Notre Dame squeaked past No. 24 Michigan State 20-19, with the crucial moment being a bizarre play where a Rick Mirer pass bounced off the chest of Spartans cornerback Todd Murray and into the hands of receiver Adrian Jarrell, putting the Irish in position to score the game-winning touchdown. No. 2 Florida State won 31-13 at Tulane, while No. 3 Auburn was idle. No. 4 Brigham Young defeated San Diego State 62-34, but No. 5 USC was blasted 31-0 by No. 21 Washington. No. 6 Tennessee, which was idle this week, moved up in the next poll: No. 1 Notre Dame, No. 2 Florida State, No. 3 Auburn, No. 4 Brigham Young, and No. 5 Tennessee.

Week Five: September 29, 1990
No. 1 Notre Dame defeated Purdue 37-11, and No. 2 Florida State beat Virginia Tech 39-28. No. 5 Tennessee had their second tie in a little over a month, as No. 3 Auburn rallied from a 17-point deficit to even the score; a missed Volunteers field goal with 15 seconds left led to a 26-26 final tally. No. 4 Brigham Young visited Oregon and lost 32-16. No. 6 Michigan won 45-17 over Maryland, and No. 7 Virginia defeated William & Mary 63-35. The next poll featured No. 1 Notre Dame, No. 2 Florida State, No. 3 Michigan, No. 4 Virginia, and No. 5 Auburn.

Week Six: October 6, 1990
The most controversial game of the season—and one of the most controversial of all time—occurred this week, when No. 12 Colorado beat Missouri on a last minute lunge by back-up quarterback Charles Johnson. The problem, however, was that Johnson actually scored on a Fifth Down due to an error by the seven officials calling the game. The game would have major ramifications for the national championship at year's end.

Meanwhile, Stanford’s Tommy Vardell scored four touchdowns (all on runs from the one-yard line) to lead the Cardinal to a 36-31 upset of No. 1 Notre Dame. No. 2 Florida State visited No. 9 Miami and lost 31-22. No. 3 Michigan dominated Wisconsin 41-3, while No. 4 Virginia was idle. No. 5 Auburn barely escaped unheralded Louisiana Tech, winning 16-14 on a last-second field goal, and the Tigers fell out of the top five in the next poll. No. 6 Tennessee was also idle, and No. 7 Oklahoma moved up with a 31-17 win at Oklahoma State: No. 1 Michigan, No. 2 Virginia, No. 3 Miami, No. 4 Oklahoma, and No. 5 Tennessee. All of the top five teams received first place votes, as did No. 8 Nebraska, No. 10 Florida, and No. 13 Houston.

Week Seven: October 13, 1990
After sitting on top of the college rankings for only four days, Michigan became the third number one team of the year to get knocked off the top spot, losing 28–27 at home in Ann Arbor to archrival Michigan State; the Wolverines failed a two-point conversion with seconds to go as Desmond Howard could not hold on to the ball when he was allegedly interfered with, in a very controversial no-call by the referees. This opened the door for No. 2 Virginia, who moved atop the polls for the first time in team history with a 31-0 shutout of North Carolina State. No. 3 Miami was similarly dominant in a 34-0 win over Kansas. 
The day's other upset of a top-five team was No. 4 Oklahoma's 14–13 loss to unranked Texas in the Red River Shootout. No. 9 Florida also endured their first loss in the Spurrier era, losing a 45–3 rout at the hands of No. 5 Tennessee despite being down only 7–3 at halftime. No. 18 Georgia Tech knocked off No. 15 Clemson, 21–19, in a game that was to be of greater importance at the end of season. The next poll featured No. 1 Virginia, No. 2 Miami, No. 3 Tennessee, No. 4 Nebraska, and No. 5 Auburn.

Week Eight: October 20, 1990
No. 1 Virginia won 49-14 at Wake Forest, but otherwise the season continued to shock as ten of the 25 ranked teams went down to defeat on an unforgettable Saturday. In a battle of national powers, No. 6 Notre Dame knocked off No. 2 Miami, 29–20, in South Bend and ensured the Hurricanes would not repeat as national champions. Perhaps an even greater upset came in Knoxville, where Alabama (with a 2–3 record), stunned No. 3 Tennessee, 9–6, just one week after the Volunteers had put up 45 points on Florida. The Vols lined up to kick a potential game winning FG with less than two minutes left only to see Stacy Harrison block the kick. The momentum from the block sent the ball forty yards back downfield and put Alabama in position to win on a last second field goal by All-American Phillip Doyle. No. 5 Auburn scored 10 points in the last 4 minutes to beat No. 7 Florida State 20–17 in a match-up of top ten teams. Auburn's win put them at No. 2 in the nation, their highest ranking since they won the national championship in 1957. No. 24 Michigan State continued their habit of close games against highly-ranked teams, losing 15-13 to No. 8 Illinois with all of the Illini’s points coming on field goals.  No. 11 Georgia Tech suffered their first imperfection of the season, but they did not lose the game thanks to a Scott Sisson field goal in the closing seconds. Their tiff with North Carolina ended in a 13–13 tie that would later haunt the Yellow Jackets. Michigan lost their second game in a row by a single point, this time to Iowa, 24–23, following their ascent to number one. The next poll featured No. 1 Virginia, No. 2 Auburn, No. 3 Notre Dame, No. 4 Nebraska, and No. 5 Illinois.

Week Nine: October 27, 1990
No. 1 Virginia was idle. No. 2 Auburn won yet another nailbiter, prevailing 17-16 over Mississippi State on a blocked extra point. No. 3 Notre Dame won 31-22 at Pittsburgh, No. 4 Nebraska beat Iowa State 45-13, and No. 5 Illinois defeated Wisconsin 21-3. The next poll featured No. 1 Virginia, No. 2 Notre Dame, No. 3 Nebraska, No. 4 Auburn, and No. 5 Illinois.

Week Ten: November 3, 1990
One of the most upset-filled days in college football history started at the top. No. 1 Virginia entered their game against No. 16 Georgia Tech short-handed, as star tight end Bruce McGonnigal ruptured his spleen in a freak accident when he fell into a concrete pit while looking for a lost dog. A late Cavaliers touchdown was nullified by a penalty called on one of McGonnigal’s backups, and this play proved to be the difference when Georgia Tech's Scott Sisson kicked a field goal with time running out for a 41-38 victory. But this game shared top billing with the showdown in Lincoln, Nebraska, between No. 3 Nebraska and No. 9 Colorado. Trailing by 12 points with only 12 minutes to play, the Buffaloes scored four touchdowns, all from Eric Bieniemy, to win 27–12. And just when the shock had worn off, No. 15 Florida routed No. 4 Auburn, 48–7, and No. 5 Illinois fell 54-28 to No. 13 Iowa. A few highly-ranked teams actually won: No. 2 Notre Dame regained the top spot with a 52-31 win over Navy, No. 6 Houston beat TCU 56-35, No. 7 Washington defeated No. 23 Arizona 54-10, and No. 8 Miami shut out Pittsburgh 45-0. The next poll featured No. 1 Notre Dame, No. 2 Washington, No. 3 Houston, No. 4 Colorado, and No. 5 Miami.

Week Eleven: November 10, 1990
In keeping with the strange season where the uncommon became commonplace, four of the top nine teams lost and the muddy national title picture got a little clearer. No. 2 Washington, poised for a possible shot at the title, lost a stunner at home to UCLA, 25–22, when the Bruins kicked the game-winning FG with seven seconds left, ending a national title dream, although the Huskies still were bound for the Rose Bowl. No. 3 Houston, with Heisman Trophy candidate David Klingler filling the shoes of departed 1989 Heisman winner Andre Ware, finally lost, falling 45–24 to No. 14 Texas and ending speculation that the national championship might go to a team on probation. Houston's bowl ineligibility assured they would be given no consideration in the final poll for a top ranking. No. 6 Iowa stumbled at home and lost to Ohio State, 27–26, as the Buckeyes scored the game-winning touchdown with one second left, ending the Hawkeyes' title bid. No. 9 Tennessee managed a fourth imperfection on their record—two losses and two ties—when they fell to No. 1 Notre Dame, 34–29.

The losses, however, helped clear the way for some other hopefuls. No. 4 Colorado beat Oklahoma State 41-22 to clinch the Big 8 title and an Orange Bowl berth, while No. 5 Miami was idle. No. 7 Georgia Tech scored their second buzzer-beating field goal in two weeks in a 6-3 win over Virginia Tech; the Yellow Jackets, whose only blemish was a tie against North Carolina in October, were now the only undefeated team in the nation. No. 8 Brigham Young won 45-14 over No. 25 Wyoming and moved up in the next poll: No. 1 Notre Dame, No. 2 Colorado, No. 3 Miami, No. 4 Georgia Tech, and No. 5 Brigham Young.

Week Twelve: November 17, 1990
The championship picture, much clearer just a week earlier, was considerably muddied again when top-ranked Notre Dame became the fifth number one to fall from the top spot as No. 18 Penn State edged the No. 1 Irish, 24–21, on a Craig Fayak field goal with 4 seconds left, coming back from a 14-point deficit. No. 2 Colorado finished their season by overwhelming Kansas State 64-3, No. 3 Miami defeated Boston College 42-12, No. 4 Georgia Tech won 42-7 at Wake Forest, No. 5 Brigham Young visited Utah for a 45-22 victory, and No. 6 Florida was victorious 47-15 at Kentucky. The next poll featured No. 1 Colorado, No. 2 Miami, No. 3 Georgia Tech, No. 4 Brigham Young, and No. 5 Florida.

Week Thirteen: November 24, 1990
No. 1 Colorado had finished their season. No. 2 Miami beat Syracuse 33-7, but undefeated No. 3 Georgia Tech (which was idle this week) moved ahead of the two-loss Hurricanes in the next poll. No. 4 Brigham Young defeated Utah State 45-10, and No. 5 Florida was idle. No. 6 Texas, who clinched the SWC title and a Cotton Bowl berth with a 22-13 win at Baylor, moved up in the next poll: No. 1 Colorado, No. 2 Georgia Tech, No. 3 Miami, No. 4 Brigham Young, and No. 5 Texas.

Week Thirteen: December 1, 1990
No. 1 Colorado had finished their season. No. 2 Georgia Tech ended the year with a 40-23 win at Georgia. No. 3 Miami barely got past unheralded San Diego State 30-28, and No. 4 Brigham Young lost 59-28 at Hawaii. No. 5 Texas beat Texas A&M 28-27 on a failed two-point conversion by the Aggies. No. 7 Notre Dame, who had already finished their schedule, moved back into the top five in the final regular-season poll: No. 1 Colorado, No. 2 Georgia Tech, No. 3 Texas, No. 4 Miami, and No. 5 Notre Dame.

In a chaotic year where nearly every club had two or more losses, the top two teams were 10-1-1 Colorado and 10-0-1 Georgia Tech. The Buffaloes had an inferior record and were the beneficiaries of the referee’s error in the Fifth Down Game, but they also played an extraordinarily tough schedule (their non-conference opponents included the champions of the Big Ten, Pac-10, and SWC as well as the second-place team in the SEC), while the Yellow Jackets faced easier opposition. As the champions of the Big 8 and ACC, the two teams were locked into the Orange and Citrus Bowls and were not able to play each other in a de facto national championship game.

Many of the bowl matchups were affected by unusual circumstances. For the second year in a row, the Orange Bowl organizers had invited top-ranked Notre Dame to play Big 8 champion Colorado in what they hoped would be a No. 1 vs. No. 2 matchup, only for the Fighting Irish to lose their next game after accepting the invitation; they had fallen to No. 5 by the time they faced No. 1 Colorado. The Sugar Bowl made an even bigger blunder by selecting Virginia as one of its participants, as the Cavaliers lost all of their remaining games after accepting the invitation and entered bowl season unranked. No. 11 Florida, the SEC champion, was barred from bowl participation due to NCAA sanctions, so No. 10 Tennessee (the only team to beat the Gators in conference play) took their place in the Sugar Bowl. The Big Ten finished in an unusual four-way tie for first place between No. 12 Michigan, No. 16 Illinois, No. 17 Iowa, and No. 22 Michigan State; the Hawkeyes, who beat all three of the other teams but lost to two lesser opponents, got the Rose Bowl bid against No. 8 Washington. The Cotton Bowl featured a relatively normal matchup between No. 3 Texas and No. 4 Miami, but the Fiesta Bowl, faced with a potential boycott over the state of Arizona’s refusal to declare Martin Luther King Jr.’s birthday a holiday, had to settle for No. 18 Louisville against No. 25 Alabama. No. 2 Georgia Tech’s Citrus Bowl opponent would be No. 19 Nebraska.

Bowl games
Although Miami had two losses, the Hurricanes would repeat as national champions if both Colorado and Georgia Tech lost while Miami won. The Hurricanes did their best, routing the Longhorns, 46–3, but the early morning 45–21 pounding of No. 19 Nebraska by Georgia Tech, closed the door on the Hurricanes chances and opened the question of whether Georgia Tech could possibly win a share if Colorado beat Notre Dame.

The wins by Miami and Georgia Tech ensured Notre Dame could not wind up as champion, but the Irish and Buffaloes fought to the finish with Colorado prevailing, 10–9, on a blocked extra point. With only 65 seconds left, it appeared Notre Dame had won when Rocket Ismail ran 91 yards with a punt return for touchdown that was called back on a clipping penalty. Deon Figures intercepted Rick Mirer's desperation pass to clinch the national title for Colorado.

UPI rankings shake-up
When the final votes were counted, Colorado had won their first national champion as voted by the Associated Press. The UPI coaches poll, however, saw a shake-up that resulted in Georgia Tech moving to No. 1 by one point. The deciding vote was cast by Colorado Buffaloes rival Nebraska's head coach Tom Osborne, the only coach who had played both teams during the 1990 season. Colorado beat Nebraska, 27–12, in Lincoln while Georgia Tech had beaten them in the Florida Citrus Bowl, 45–21.

See also
 Fifth Down Game (1990)

References